Sandeep Gollen (born 27 May 1972) is an Indian boxer. He competed in the men's light welterweight event at the 1992 Summer Olympics.

References

External links
 

1972 births
Living people
Indian male boxers
Olympic boxers of India
Boxers at the 1992 Summer Olympics
Place of birth missing (living people)
Light-welterweight boxers